Henry Alexander may refer to:

Henry Alexander (painter) (1860–1894), American painter
Henry Alexander (Irish politician) (1763–1818), Member of the Parliament of Ireland 1788–1800, UK Parliament 1801–06
Henry Alexander (1787–1861), MP for Barnstaple, 1826–30
Henry P. Alexander (1801–1867), American politician
Henry Templer Alexander (1911–1977), British general
Henry Alexander (cricketer) (1841–1920), English cricketer

See also
Harry Alexander (disambiguation)